Jack Albert Youngerman (March 25, 1926 – February 19, 2020) was an American artist known for his constructions and paintings.

Biography
Jack Youngerman was born in 1926 in Webster Groves, Missouri, moving to Louisville, Kentucky in 1929 with his family. He studied art at the University of North Carolina from 1944 to 1946 under a wartime navy training program, and graduated from the University of Missouri in 1947. In the fall of 1947, Youngerman moved to Paris on a G.I. Scholarship; he enrolled at the Ecole des Beaux-Arts where he studied with Jean Souverbie. He traveled to the Netherlands, Belgium, Spain, Italy and Greece, to visit art museums and historic sites. In 1948, he formed a lifelong friendship with Ellsworth Kelly and also met Eduardo Paolozzi and César, each fellow students at Ecole des Beaux-Arts. In 1950, Youngerman married the French actress Delphine Seyrig (1932–1990).

That same year, Youngerman had his first group exhibition, Les Mains eblouies at Galerie Maeght in Paris, which also included Pierre Alechinsky, Eduardo Chillida and Corneille. He visited the studios of Constantin Brancusi and Jean Arp with Kelly, and found himself influenced by their sense of organic form. He met Alexander Calder through his father-in-law, Henri Seyrig, a renowned archaeologist and cultural attache to the Free French delegation to the United States. During this time he became interested in the resurgence of geometric abstraction in Paris, especially in exhibitions such as Salon des Réalités Nouvelles which included Max Bill, Auguste Herbin and Richard Lohse. Youngerman also visited the Salon de Mai to see the most current work of the School of Paris artists, among them such masters as Henri Matisse.

Youngerman died of complications from a fall in Stony Brook, New York on February 19, 2020, at the age of 93.

Public collections
Boca Raton Museum of Art, Boca Raton, FL
Carnegie Museum of Art, Pittsburgh, PA
Columbus Museum of Art, Columbus, OH
Denver Art Museum, Denver, CO
Edith Green-Wendell Wyatt Federal Building, Portland, OR
Frederick R. Weisman Art Museum, Minneapolis, MN
Governor Nelson A. Rockefeller Empire State Plaza Art Collection, Albany, NY
High Museum, Atlanta, GA
Hunter Museum of Art, Chattanooga, TN
Marion Koogler McNay Art Museum, San Antonio, TX
Michael C. Carlos Museum, Atlanta, GA
Neuberger Museum of Art, Purchase, NY
Newark Museum, Newark, NJ
North Carolina Museum of Art, Raleigh, NC
The Phillips Collection, Washington, DC
Reynolds Metals Corporation, Richmond, VA
San Francisco Museum of Modern Art, SF, CA
Smithsonian American Art Museum, Washington DC
Solomon R. Guggenheim Museum, New York, NY
University of Michigan Museum of Art, Ann Arbor, MI
Walker Art Center, Minneapolis, MN
Whitney Museum of American Art, New York, NY
Wright Museum of Art, Beloit, WI
Yale University Art Gallery, New Haven, CT

Exhibitions

Solo exhibitions
 1981- Washburn Gallery, New York
 1986- Solomon R. Guggenheim Museum, New York

References

External links

 Jack Youngerman fine art prices, auction results, auction images
Jack Youngerman in the permanent collection at the University of Michigan Museum of Art
Jack Youngerman in the permanent collection at the Smithsonian American Art Museum
Jack Youngerman in the permanent collection at the McNay Art Museum

1926 births
2020 deaths
20th-century American painters
20th-century American male artists
American male painters
21st-century American painters
21st-century American male artists
Artists from Louisville, Kentucky
Painters from Kentucky
People from Webster Groves, Missouri
Painters from Missouri
University of Missouri alumni
United States Navy personnel of World War II